Crumley–Lynn–Lodge House is a historic home located near Winchester, Frederick County, Virginia. The earliest section was built about 1759, and was a -story, log section raised to a full two stories about 1850.  About 1830, a two-story, Federal style brick section was added.  A two-story frame section was added to the original log section in 1987–1994. The front facade features a folk Victorian-style front porch with square columns, sawn brackets and pendants, and plain handrail and balusters. Also on the property are the contributing mid-19th-century brick granary, and log meat house, as well as a late-19th century corn crib, and the stone foundation of a barn.

It was listed on the National Register of Historic Places in 2006.

See also
 National Register of Historic Places listings in Frederick County, Virginia

References

External links
 

Houses on the National Register of Historic Places in Virginia
Federal architecture in Virginia
Houses completed in 1830
Houses in Frederick County, Virginia
National Register of Historic Places in Frederick County, Virginia
1830 establishments in Virginia